The Bahay ng Pagbabago ("House of Change"), formerly known as the Bahay Pangarap ("Dream House" ), is a residential building inside the Malacañang Palace complex in Manila, Philippines. It has been used as the official residence of current president Bongbong Marcos, as well as former presidents Benigno Aquino III and Rodrigo Duterte during their presidencies, instead of taking residence at Malacañang proper as done by their predecessors.

History

Original house (1930s–2008)
The Bahay ng Pagbabago's original structure was built in the 1930s by the Bureau of Public Works and was designed by architect Juan Arellano. It was originally built as a rest house of the Malacañang Park for informal activities and social functions of the president. The Malacañang Park itself was converted from a rice field south of the Malacañang Palace during the administration of President Manuel L. Quezon.

The rest house underwent refurbishment in the early 1960s initiated by First Lady Eva Macapagal, wife of President Diosdado Macapagal. Macapagal gave the name "Bahay Pangarap" to the rest house.

During the administration of President Fidel V. Ramos, the house was repurposed as a clubhouse for the Malacañang Golf Club. In 1996, it was made as an alternative venue for official government functions, in addition to social and recreational events.

Onglao house (2008–)
The Bahay Pangarap underwent renovation in 2008 under architect Conrad Onglao. The structure was essentially demolished and rebuilt in a contemporary style. Its roof has a basic design which was adopted from the previous structure.

President Benigno Aquino III took residence in the Bahay Pangarap during his tenure from 2010 to 2016. He preferred to live in his private house in Times Street in Quezon City and refused to take residence at the Malacañang Palace or the nearby Arlegui mansion because the buildings are "too big" for a bachelor like him. He made a compromise, taking residence in Bahay Pangarap, where the presidential guards could better guarantee his safety. Aquino is the first president to make the Bahay Pangarap his official residence.

After President Rodrigo Duterte took office in 2016, he moved into the Bahay Pangarap, which was renamed as "Bahay ng Pagbabago". The name change was a bid of the Duterte administration to distance itself from the "pipe dream" of its immediate predecessor.

It is now the official residence of current President Bongbong Marcos since June 30, 2022.

Facilities
The house is located at Malacañang Park beside the compound of the Presidential Security Group, which situated on the opposite side of the Pasig River fronting Malacañang Palace itself. Prior to 2010, it only has a single bedroom and a swimming pool. Three additional rooms were added when President Benigno Aquino III made the house his official residence; a guest room, a room each for the president's household staff and close-in security aides.

References

Buildings and structures in Paco, Manila
Presidential residences in the Philippines
Official residences in the Philippines
Malacañang Palace